The 1923 WAFL season was the 39th season of the West Australian Football League. It saw East Perth set an unequalled WAFL record of five consecutive premierships, which in major Australian Rules leagues has only been beaten by SANFL club Port Adelaide with six straight from 1954 to 1959 and equalled by Sturt between 1966 and 1970. The Royals prevailed after two superb games with East Fremantle, who had had its last two home-and-away games cancelled due to undertaking a tour of Victoria and South Australia.

The top four teams was unchanged for the third successive season, and tailender Perth looked likely to suffer a winless season before winning its last match – a fate the Redlegs would suffer again in 2000.

Home-and-away season

Round 1

Round 2

Round 3

Round 4

Round 5

Round 6

Round 7

Round 8

Round 9

Round 10

Round 11

Round 12

Round 13

Round 14

Round 15

Ladder

Finals

First semi-final

Second semi-final

Final

Grand Final

References

External links
Official WAFL website
West Australian Football League (WAFL), 1923

West Australian Football League seasons
WAFL